Simpson Street School is a historic school complex located at Mechanicsburg in Cumberland County, Pennsylvania. The complex consists of a Romanesque Revival style building built in 1892, and two Late Gothic Revival style buildings added in the 1920s. The 1892 building is square in plan, 2 1/2-stories with a raised basement.  It is built pressed brick and features three ornate projecting entrances.  The addition was built in two phases, in 1926 and 1929.  It is two-stories and constructed of yellow brick with brownstone trim.  It was used as a high school until 1957, then as a junior high until 1981, when it was sold by the school district.

It was listed on the National Register of Historic Places in 1983.

References 

Former school buildings in the United States
School buildings on the National Register of Historic Places in Pennsylvania
Romanesque Revival architecture in Pennsylvania
Gothic Revival architecture in Pennsylvania
School buildings completed in 1892
Buildings and structures in Cumberland County, Pennsylvania
National Register of Historic Places in Cumberland County, Pennsylvania